Brickellia eupatorioides, or false boneset, is a North American species of flowering plants in the family Asteraceae. It is widespread in Mexico from Chihuahua to Oaxaca, and in all regions of the contiguous United States except New England, New York, and the West Coast.

Brickellia eupatorioides is a perennial up to 200 cm (80 inches) tall, growing from a woody base. It produces many small flower heads with yellow, lavender, or maroon disc florets but no ray florets.

Varieties
Brickellia eupatorioides var. chlorolepis   (Wooton & Standley) B. L. Turner - Mexico, southwestern USA
Brickellia eupatorioides var. corymbulosa (Torr. & A.Gray) Shinners - Great Plains, Mississippi Valley
Brickellia eupatorioides var. eupatorioides - eastern USA
Brickellia eupatorioides var. floridana (R.W.Long) B.L.Turner - southern Florida
Brickellia eupatorioides var. gracillima (A.Gray) B.L.Turner - Ark., Mo., Okla., Tex. 
Brickellia eupatorioides var. texana (Shinners) Shinners - Ark., Kans., Mo., Okla., Tex

References

eupatorioides
Flora of the Eastern United States
Flora of Mexico
Flora of the United States
Plants described in 1849
Taxa named by Carl Linnaeus